Sands Point is a village located at the tip of the Cow Neck Peninsula in the Town of North Hempstead, in Nassau County, on the North Shore of Long Island, in New York, United States. It is considered part of the Greater Port Washington area, which is anchored by Port Washington. The population was 2,675 at the 2010 census.

History
The village was incorporated in 1910, and is named for the Sands family. In 1912, the village absorbed the communities of Barkers Point and Motts Point, and in 1932, it absorbed the Harbor Acreas community. It was originally owned by three families: the Sands, the Vanderbilts, and the Cornwells. 

In 1917, Daniel Guggenheim bought his  Hempstead House, formerly Castle Gould. His son Harry Guggenheim, founder of Newsday, later erected his estate "Falaise" nearby in 1923. Today, the estate belongs to the Friends of the Sands Point Preserve, which is a non-profit organization that maintains the property. 

In the 1960s, under less strict building codes, many homes were built on  parcels.

The Sands Family Cemetery was added to the National Register of Historic Places in 1992.

Geography

Sands Point is bordered on three sides by water – the Long Island Sound to the north, Manhasset Bay to the west and Hempstead Harbor on the east. It shares land borders with the villages of Port Washington North and Manorhaven, as well as the unincorporated hamlet of Port Washington.

Sands Point is located at the tip of the Cow Neck Peninsula (also known as the Port Washington Peninsula or as Manhasset Neck), which is bordered by Manhasset Bay, Hempstead Bay, and Long Island Sound.

Economy 
The village is completely residential in character. There are no areas zoned for business, commercial, or industrial uses located anywhere within the Village of Sands Point. 

Sands Point is considered a bedroom community of the City of New York, and many residents commute to/from New York for work.

Demographics

As of the census of 2010,  2,675 people, 872 households, and 762 families were residing in the village. The population density was 636.9 people/sq mi (243.2/km2). The 934 housing units had an average density of 222.4/sq mi (84.9/km2). The racial makeup of the village was 88.6% White, 0.8% African American, 8.2% Asian, 1.1% from other races, and 1.3% from two or more races. Hispanics or Latinos of any race were 4.7% of the population.

Of the 872 households,  38.3% had children under 18 living with them, 80.6% were married couples living together, 4.1% had a female householder with no husband present, and 12.6% were not families. About 10.4% of the households were made up of individuals, and 7.1% had someone living alone who was 65 years of age or older. The average household size was 3.03, and the average family size was 3.21.

In the village, the age distribution was 26.4% under 18, 5.6% from 18 to 24, 15.4% from 25 to 44, 34.0% from 45 to 64, and 18.7% who were 65  or older. The median age was 45.4 years. For every 100 females, there were 95.7 males. For every 100 females age 18 and over, there were 95.4 males.

As of 2018, the median income for a household in the village was $231,667, with it being named the richest town in New York. Males had a median income of $158,500 versus $44,943 for females. The per capita income for the village was $112,716. None of families and 0.5% of the population were below the poverty line, including none under age 18 or 65 or over.

Government

Village government 
As of August 2022, the Mayor of Sands Point is Peter A. Forman, the Deputy Mayor is Jeffrey Moslow, and the Village Trustees are Elena Karabatos, Jeffrey Moslow, Rebecca Vitas Schamis, and Sloane Ackerman.

Village police 

The Village of Sands Point operates its own police department. The Sands Point Police Department, as such, is responsible for providing police protection services within the village.

As of August 2022, the Police Commissioner of Sands Point is Mayor Peter A. Forman and the Chief of Police is Thomas Ruehle.

Representation in higher government

Town representation 
Sands Point is located in the Town of North Hempstead's 6th council district, which as of August 2022 is represented on the North Hempstead Town Council by Mariann Dalimonte (D – Port Washington).

Nassau County representation 
Sands Point is located in Nassau County's 11th Legislative district, which as of August 2022 is represented in the Nassau County Legislature by Delia DiRiggi-Whitton (D–Glen Cove).

New York State representation

New York State Assembly 
Sands Point is located within the New York State Assembly's 16th Assembly district, which as of August 2022 is represented by Gina Sillitti (D–Manorhaven).

New York State Senate 
Sands Point is located in the New York State Senate's 7th State Senate district, which as of August 2022 is represented in the New York State Senate by Anna Kaplan (D–North Hills).

Federal representation

United States Congress 
Sands Point is located in New York's 3rd congressional district, which as of August 2022 is represented in the United States Congress by Tom Suozzi (D–Glen Cove).

United States Senate 
Like the rest of New York, Sands Point is represented in the United States Senate by Charles Schumer (D) and Kirsten Gillibrand (D).

Politics 
In the 2016 U.S. presidential election, the majority of Sands Point voters voted for Hillary Clinton (D).

Parks and recreation 

The Sands Point Golf Club and the Village Club of Sands Point are both located in Sands Point.

The Village Club, once the IBM Country Club, was purchased in 1994 by the village.

Additionally, Nassau County's Sands Point Preserve is located within the village.

Education

School district 
Sands Point is located entirely within the boundaries of (and is thus served by) the Port Washington Union Free School District. As such, all students who reside within the village and attend public schools go to Port Washington's schools.

Additionally the Port Washington UFSD's Guggenheim Elementary School is located within the village.

Library district 
Sands Point is located entirely within the boundaries of the Port Washington Library District.

Notable people
 Marv Albert (born 1941), sportscaster.
 Alva Belmont (1853–1933), socialite and suffragette.
 Carlos Beltrán (born 1977), professional baseball player.
 Len Berman (born 1947), television sportscaster and morning radio host.
 John Cassavetes (1929–1989), actor and film director; graduated from Port Washington High School in 1947.
 Stanley Chais (1926–2010), investment advisor in the Madoff investment scandal.
 Perry Como (1912–2001), singer.
 Frank Costello (1891–1973), mobster, crime boss, and racketeer.
 Howard Gould (1871–1959), financier.
 Harry Guggenheim (1890-1971), aviator, newspaper publisher, and racehorse owner/breeder.
 W. Averell Harriman (1891–1986), former Governor of New York.
 Pamela Harriman (1920–1997), socialite and W. Averell Harriman's third wife.
 William Randolph Hearst (1863–1951), publisher.
 John La Gatta (1894–1977), illustrator.
 Kenneth C. Langone (born 1935), co-founder (financial backer) of Home Depot.
 Edgar F. Luckenbach (1868–1943), shipping magnate.
 Condé Montrose Nast (1873–1942), publisher.
 Charles Cary Rumsey (1879–1922), sculptor, husband of Mary Harriman Rumsey.
 Mary Harriman Rumsey, (1881-1934), founder of The Junior League, member National Women's Hall of Fame.
 Arnold A. Saltzman (1916–2014), businessman, diplomat, art collector, and philanthropist.
 James R. Shepley (1917–1988), reporter and publishing executive.
 Felix Sater (born 1966), real-estate developer and career criminal.
 John Philip Sousa (1854–1932), composer.
 Herbert Bayard Swope (1882–1958), editor and journalist.
 William Tavoulareas (1919-1996), president of the Mobil Oil Company.
 Don Vultaggio (born 1951/1952), founder of the Arizona Beverage Company.

Sands Point and The Great Gatsby
In F. Scott Fitzgerald's The Great Gatsby (1925), Sands Point (Port Washington/Manhasset/Cow Neck) was referred to as "East Egg". East Egg residents inherited their fortunes and were more highly respected than the nouveau riche in newer "West Egg" (Great Neck/Kings Point), because Sands Point had "old money". The story's fictional Buchanans lived in the western part of Sands Point. Reports incorrectly suggest that Fitzgerald – while he was a guest at the mansion of Herbert Bayard Swope on Hoffstot Lane, at Prospect Point in Sands Point – used the site and its parties as his inspiration for the fictional Buchanan home in East Egg. The home may have served as one of the many inspirations, as Fitzgerald did likely visit it during his time living in Great Neck (1922–24), but not as a guest of Swope's. Fitzgerald left Great Neck for Paris in 1924, prior to Swope's purchase of that mansion. The likely story with regard to Swope is that Fitzgerald and his good friend Ring Lardner would observe many parties held at the home Swope was residing in during the time Fitzgerald was actually living in the area. This Swope residence was adjacent to Lardner's home on Shore Road in Great Neck, and is no longer extant, though Lardner's mansion is still standing.

Another Sands Point mansion, situated next to the Sands Point Light and across a shallow bay from Prospect Point, was Beacon Towers. Scholars believe it served as one of the many inspirations for Jay Gatsby's mansion in the novel, though Gatsby lived on the eastern side of Kings Point, in the book. The extravagant Gothic-style residence was built by Alva Belmont, formerly Alva Vanderbilt, in 1918. It was demolished in 1945.

References

External links

 Official website
 Sands Point Village Police Department

Long Island Sound
Populated coastal places in New York (state)
Town of North Hempstead, New York
Villages in Nassau County, New York
Villages in New York (state)